Dunnellen Hall is a private mansion located at 521 Round Hill Road in Greenwich, Connecticut, USA.  It was sold by the estate of Leona Helmsley for $35 million down from the original asking price of $125 million when it was first put up on the market in 2008.

Dunnellen Hall was built for New York City financier Daniel G. Reid as a gift for his daughter in 1918. Dunnellen Hall was built for approximately $1 million. It was purchased in 1983 by Leona Helmsley and her husband Harry for US$11 million. Leona Helmsley would live in Dunnellen Hall until her death in 2007. According to the Greenwich Historical Society, Dunnellen Hall is one of the last intact historic estates left in Greenwich.

21st century renovations

Between 2011 and 2014, the mansion's square footage was decreased from 23,000 square feet to approximately 17,000 square feet due to renovations including the demolition of the indoor pool covered by a dance floor constructed by the Helmsleys. Two outdoor fountains, including a large external front entrance one, were also removed. Many of the interior rooms were refurbished and/or updated to a more modern appearance, removing the darker mahogany wood tones of the Helmsley era. The once grand dual staircase is now a singular staircase structure opening from the main entrance to the second floor.

As of October 2019, the estate was listed for sale for US$16.5 million.

References

External links
Real estate Listing with Christie's Great Estates
Real estalker Blog Posting
Dunnellen Hall at DamnedCT.com

Houses completed in 1918
Houses in Greenwich, Connecticut